The big-scale pomfret (Taractichthys longipinnis) also known as the long-finned bream, is a species of marine ray-finned fish, a pomfret of the family Bramidae. This species reaches a length of up to  SL. This species is of minor importance to the commercial fisheries industry.
From Ireland there are only two records of this fish. The last being from Co. Wicklow.

References
 
 Tony Ayling & Geoffrey Cox, Collins Guide to the Sea Fishes of New Zealand,  (William Collins Publishers Ltd, Auckland, New Zealand 1982) 

Taractichthys
Fish described in 1843